Bareshkan (also Romanized as Bāreshkān) is a village in Jask Rural District, in the Central District of Jask County, Hormozgan Province, Iran. At the 2006 census, its population was 53, in 15 families.

References 

Populated places in Jask County